Jinshan District, is a suburban district of southwestern Shanghai, neighboring Zhejiang province and Hangzhou Bay. Jinshan District, located in the southwest of Shanghai, is one of the biggest districts of the city. Local political administration is divided into nine towns and one subdistrict. There are several beaches along the  shoreline, which are popular tourism destinations.

As the city of Shanghai has grown, Jinshan has experienced rapid changes, evolving from a relatively rural area to a more suburban environment. With completion of the high-speed highway in 2008, a new bus line was opened between Shanghai and Jinshan. This Shimei Line (t , s ) travels between the bus station in Jinshan and another beside the Jinjiang Park station on Line 1 of the Shanghai Metro. Travel time is about an hour, depending on traffic and time of day, and costs  each way.

Since 2012, the Shanghai Suburban Railway system also offers connections to Jinshan. This service, the Jinshan Railway, connects Jinshanwei railway station to Shanghai South railway station in downtown Shanghai in about 30 minutes.

The district is home to the Donglin Temple, a Buddhist temple dedicated to Guanyin, the bodhisattva of compassion. Jinshan peasant painting, which originated in the town of Fengjing, has become a nationally and internationally exhibited form of folk art.

Economy
Jinshan District is home to the headquarters of Shanghai Petrochemical Company Ltd and Jinshan Industrial Park.

Tourist attractions
Going to Jinshan can be by a convenient suburban train from South Railway Station to Jinshan (10 RMB, 30min, non-stop). Check the schedule as the time between trains can be an hour.

Other attractions around Jinshan are:
 Ancient Town of Fengjing 
 Donglin Temple.

Jinshan City Beach
Location: 5 Shihuaxincheng Road, Jinshan, Shanghai (free shuttle bus from train station in summer, 20 minute walk, or bus 2)
Admission fee: 20RMB (weekends) 10RMB (week days)

Jinshanwei town is home to Jinshan City Beach, one of the few beaches within the city boundaries of Shanghai. The large beach with imported sand from Hainan is clean and boxed-in by a concrete wall. Locals prefer sitting in a tent over sunbathing. It offers facilities including restaurants, toilets, and for (100RMB for 90min) 5 beach volleyball and 3 beach soccer fields, trampoline, water balloon shooting, jetski

It is a favorite spot for couples take their pre-wedding pictures.
An annual beach fireworks display is held in August.

Jinshan Binhai Park
Location: 16 Xincheng Road, Shihua Street, Jinshan, Shanghai

Nearby Jinshan City Beach is a seaside park. There are large lawns, large artificial lakes, rockery buildings and pavilions in the park including a small children’s playground with amusement facilities such as bumper cars, swivel chairs, rotating cups, and sheep carts.

Jinshanzui Fishing Village
Jinshanwei is the site of the historic Jinshanzui Fishing Village (Jinshanzui Yucun, 金山嘴渔村) located 30 minute walk from the beach or five minutes by taxi.
It is a small village on Hangzhou Bay with a beautiful scenery and the earliest (dating back more than 2,000 years) and last fishing village in Shanghai. Xiangyu Lake in summer has thousands of lotus flowers. Tourist attractions include teahouses, small inns, seafood specialties (shrimp, sea eel and jelly fish head), fishery museum and a folk art gallery.

Subdistrict and towns
Jinshan District has one subdistrict, nine towns and one special township-level division.

Climate

Notable residents
 Qian Zhijun - A Chinese actor and entertainer who first gained fame as part of the "Little Fatty" internet meme

Transportation

Commuter rail
Jinshan is currently served by one suburban line operated by China Railway:
 – Tinglin, Jinshan Industrial Park, Jinshanwei

References

Further reading

 

Districts of Shanghai